K. S. Zaslonov Children's Railroad in Minsk is a  narrow gauge railroad loop passing through the Chelyuskinites Park in Minsk, Belarus.

Overview
It is fully operated by teenagers.  One of many children's railways that existed in the USSR and continued functioning after its breakup in post-Soviet states, it was opened on July 9, 1955. There was a 3-year program to train future railway personnel. In 1971 the railway was named after railman Konstantin Zaslonov, a Hero of the Soviet Union who had commanded a partisan brigade.

The railway line counts 3 stations (listed from north to south): Zaslonovo, Pionerskaya (or Pionerskaja) and Sosnovy Bor (or Sosnovyj Bor); and a pair of rail loops after the end stops. Zaslonovo is located between the Metro stations Park Čaliuskincaŭ and Maskoŭskaja, both on the Maskoŭskaja line.

Photogallery

See also

Children's railway
Rail transport in Belarus
Belorusskaja Železnaja Doroga
Minsk Passazhirsky railway station

References

External links

 Official site of the railway
 K.S. Zaslonov children's railway (on dzd-ussr.ru)

Amusement rides introduced in 1955
Transport in Minsk 
Rail transport in Belarus
Children's railways
Buildings and structures built in the Soviet Union
Rail transport in the Soviet Union
750 mm gauge railways in Belarus
1955 establishments in Belarus